Ernest Edward Thomas, MM (16 December 1884 – February 1939) was an Irish cavalryman in the British Army and drummer. While serving with the 4th (Royal Irish) Dragoon Guards he fired the first British shot of the First World War in Europe, at 7am on 22 August 1914, in an engagement outside Mons.

Early life
Although it has been reported that Thomas was born in Nenagh, County Tipperary, it has now been established that he was born in London of Irish ancestry. Thomas joined the British Army as a drummer in the Royal Horse Artillery, but transferred to the 4th (Royal Irish) Dragoon Guards before the outbreak of hostilities.

First World War
It was while serving as a corporal in the 4th (Royal Irish) Dragoon Guards that Thomas is reported to have fired the first British shot of the First World War in Europe. He was promoted to sergeant on 5 November 1915 and transferred to the Machine Gun Corps in 1916. Thomas was also mentioned in dispatches for bravery. While positioned in a slit trench he advanced on his opposite number after British shelling of the enemy lines, to find all the German soldiers killed. Noting the quality of the German boots, he removed them from several soldiers, tied them together and crawled back to his own lines, where he distributed them amongst his friends. Thomas was awarded the Military Medal during his service.

Later life and death
Thomas returned to the Royal Irish Dragoons at the end of hostilities and was discharged in 1923. He then became the Commissionnaire at the Duke of Yorks Cinema. While at work in February 1939, Thomas became ill and subsequently died of pneumonia. He was buried with full military honours.

See also
Alhaji Grunshi, of the Gold Coast Regiment, the first soldier anywhere in British service to fire a shot in the First World War, on 7 August 1914.
Charles Beck Hornby, reputed to have become the first British soldier to kill a German soldier, using his sword, in the same action on 22 August 1914.

References

Royal Horse Artillery soldiers
4th Royal Irish Dragoon Guards soldiers
Machine Gun Corps soldiers
British Army personnel of World War I
1884 births
1939 deaths
Recipients of the Military Medal
Deaths from pneumonia in the United Kingdom
Military personnel from London